Andrew Jarrett (born 9 January 1958) is a former professional tennis player from the United Kingdom.

Jarrett enjoyed most of his tennis success while playing doubles. During his career he won one doubles title. He achieved a career-high doubles ranking of World No. 85 in 1983.

Jarrett was made tournament referee at Wimbledon in 2006 after the retirement of Alan Mills. He held this title until the 2019 Wimbledon Finals after holding the post for 14 years.

Career finals

Doubles (1 title, 5 runner-ups)

References

External links
 
 

English male tennis players
British male tennis players
People from Belper
1958 births
Living people
Tennis people from Derbyshire